The Bridge Canyon Wilderness is a small wilderness area located in the Newberry Mountains in southern Nevada, United States, in the Lake Mead National Recreation Area. The rock outcrops and caves make this area very striking. Stands of cottonwood trees can be found along the Grapevine Wash and Sacatone Wash water courses. Canyon grape, cattails and rushes grow in Grapevine Canyon. Discover the petroglyphs of early Native Americans in the canyon.  Reptiles include the Western chuckwalla, side-blotched lizard, and Gila monster.

Characteristics

NWPS
Bridge Canyon Wilderness became part of the National Wilderness Preservation System in 2002.

References

See also
Grapevine Canyon (Nevada)
Grapevine Canyon Petroglyphs

Wilderness areas of Nevada